Ágúst Elí Björgvinsson (born 11 April 1995) is an Icelandic handball player for Ribe-Esbjerg HH and the Icelandic national team.

He participated at the 2018 European Men's Handball Championship.

References

1995 births
Living people
Agust Eli Bjorgvinsson
Agust Eli Bjorgvinsson
Expatriate handball players
Agust Eli Bjorgvinsson
IK Sävehof players